Justin Summerton (born 14 January 1968, Wirral, England) is a New Zealand artist and writer, who lives in Dunedin, New Zealand.

Early life and development

Justin Summerton was born in Wirral Peninsula, in North West England. In 1972, when he was four years old, his family emigrated to New Zealand, where he lives presently.

Summerton spent the next couple of decades in Dunedin. He completed a Bachelor of Commerce degree (1987) and a Bachelor of Arts degree (1993) at the University of Otago.

In 1990, Summerton got a studio flat at St Clair Esplanade, in Dunedin, where he did some of his early experiments with oils, working mainly with seascapes. The following year, he had his first solo exhibition, at O'Brooks Gallery in Dunedin.

Travelling and street painting
In 1992, Summerton travelled to Liverpool. He rented a studio at the Bluecoat Chambers and worked on Liverpool cityscapes. He then went to paint and explore Paris, and then Copenhagen, in Denmark, where he was commissioned to paint a mural.

Two years later, he went to the United States. There, he exhibited in Detroit and began "live painting" in Central Park in New York City. He then continued with street painting in Nice, in the Côte d'Azur, South of France. In 1995, he worked in a log cabin in Mendocino, Northern California. At that time, he exhibited his photomontage projects and oil on canvas at the International Art Café, in Haight-Ashbury, San Francisco.

A year later, he was working at a studio in Redfern, in Sydney, Australia. While living there, he exhibited in a group show at the Darlinghurst Gallery, and he contributed with a photomontage study to the first Australian auction of contemporary photography at the Wemyss Gallery.

In 1997, Summerton did paintings and photomontage studies of Tenerife (Canary Islands), Spain, Portugal, and London (live painting at Leicester Square).

From 1997 to 1999, Summerton was based in Dunedin, working on his technique and basing his work around the St Clair seascape. In 1999, being a keen surfer, he based himself in Karekare, west of Auckland, living initially at Bob Harvey’s bach. He is currently based in St Clair, Dunedin.

Themes and technique

Justin Summerton is a surrealist painter who depicts a dreamlike world in his work, often presenting New Zealand as a primeval landscape. In his work, Summerton reveals a fascination with New Zealand natural elements, such as the sea, volcanic cones, mountains and cloud formations, which constitute the basis of all his work. His latest paintings have been described as inhabiting "a strange milieu halfway between representational landscape and surrealist dreamscape." The artist makes the landscapes his own, by rearranging and/or adapting them to his vision, obeying to symbolic or allegorical purposes.

The surrealist painter favours a utopian New Zealand: "Most of my art is related to the ecology of the world," Summerton says. "I'm not a hippy, greenie painter who rants on, but maybe I am an environmentalist. New Zealand is a bit of an oasis like that and I've had that theme running through my work for a while."

"Summerton’s works harness the raw energy of New Zealand landforms and coast lines through the texture of his paint. He captures and intensifies this power with layers upon layers of dense oils, culminating in a landscape that is far from traditional, and so referring to New Zealand landscape with a fresh perspective."

At a recent solo show of his paintings, his technique was described as "scrumbling", a "brushstroke technique to build layers of colour and texture onto the canvas surface. This approach tends to modify rather than obscure the previous layer and creates stark contrast between dark and light pigments. The overall result is a fresh and vibrant new view of the New Zealand landscape." According to Warwick Henderson Gallery administrator Pania Lincoln, "his intensive application of oils builds layers of colour and texture that give the works a visual and literal 3-dimentional [sic] quality that is unique."

Justin feels a particular affinity with the New Zealand coastline and beaches, spending much of his time in the water as a passionate surfer. He explores the shores of many beaches throughout New Zealand in his paintings, from Piha (Auckland) to St Clair Beach (Dunedin).

Summerton has been identified as one of the New Zealand contemporary artists whose work is being thrown into the investment fine art market within only a few years of being produced. Proof of that is the fact that Summerton has one work in a public collection - the Aigantighe Art Gallery of Timaru, New Zealand - and another work (Lamp on a Pedestal, 2002) - in New Zealand's largest private collection, the Wallace Arts Trust Collection.

Justin Summerton exhibits at the Warwick Henderson Gallery in Parnell, Auckland, and sells work regularly through the International Art Centre in Parnell, Auckland, New Zealand. Numerous works by the artist have been sold at auction, including Cape Byron Lighthouse (2008), sold at the International Art Centre 'Fine Art Auction' in 2009.

Books 
2013 - The Last Secret Wave (Kindle e-book)

Awards

1999 Mainland Art Awards – Merit prize for "White Island, Night"

Exhibitions

Solo exhibitions

2012 – Surrealist in a Dreamlike World – International Art Centre, Auckland, new Zealand

2008 – Oasis – Warwick Henderson Gallery, Auckland, New Zealand

2006 – Beaches and Islands – Warwick Henderson Gallery, Auckland, New Zealand

2005 – New Works – Warwick Henderson Gallery, Auckland, New Zealand

2003 – Interiors – Warwick Henderson Gallery, Auckland, New Zealand

2003 – Rushcutter Bay Gallery, Sydney, Australia

2003 – Dowling St Gallery, Dunedin, New Zealand

2002 – Volcanic Cones – Warwick Henderson Gallery, Auckland, New Zealand

2000 – New Works – Warwick Henderson Gallery, Auckland, New Zealand

1999 – Primeval New Zealand Landscapes – Warwick Henderson Gallery, Auckland, New Zealand

1993 – Paintings and Photographic studies of England and Europe – Carnegie Gallery, Dunedin, New Zealand

1991 – O'Brooks Gallery, Dunedin, New Zealand

Collective exhibitions
2001 – Bowen Galleries, Wellington, New Zealand

1999-2000 – Millennium and America's Cup Show – Warwick Henderson Gallery, Auckland, New Zealand

1999 – Beyond Beauty – Peters Muir Petford Gallery, Auckland, New Zealand

1996 – Nexus Gallery, Sydney, Australia

1995 – International Art Café, San Francisco, California, United States

1994 – Detroit, Michigan, United States

Selected bibliography

Caughey, E. M. (2002). Art New Zealand Today: Sixty Exhibiting New Zealand Artists. Auckland, NZ: Saint Publishing.

Cranmer, U.; Pearson, H.; Martin, M. & Braddock, G. (2008). Landforms in Contemporary Art. Whangaparaoa, NZ: Integrated Education.

Daly-Peoples, J. (2002). "Representational Dreamscapes", in The National Business Review, 1 February 2002, p. 23.

Harvey, B. (2003). Rolling Thunder: The Spirit of Karekare. New Zealand: Exisle Publishing.

Harvey, B. (2004). Westies: Up Front Out There. New Zealand: Exisle Publishing.

Robinson, D. (2008). New Zealand's Favourite Artists 2. Auckland, NZ: Saint Publishing.

Topp, A. (2009). Creating Waves. New Zealand: HarperCollins Publishers.

References

External links
 Justin Summerton’s Official Website (archive)
 Warwick Henderson Gallery – Artists: Justin Summerton
 The Wallace Arts Trust

1968 births
Living people
New Zealand surrealist artists
New Zealand painters
Artists from Dunedin